Hubert Bagster Trumper (27 December 1902 – 1975) was a British doctor and writer (as Hubert Bagster).

He was born in Market Rasen, Lincolnshire, on 27 December 1902. His father was Oscar Bagster Trumper (1872-1932), also a doctor.

In 1926, he was a medical student, travelling in the US and Canada.

On 4 April 1928, he was promoted to Lieutenant in the Royal Army Medical Corps.

In 1929, he married Frances E Greener in Birmingham.

Trumper was dismissed by ICI after raising his concerns about workers being exposed to the risk of cancer.

In 1958, the New York Times called Gallstones and Ghosts "richly entertaining clinical reminiscences".

Publications (as Hubert Bagster)
Gallstones and Ghosts: The Casebook Of A Country Doctor 1957, Simon and Schuster
Country Practice 1957, Andre Deutsch
Doctor's Weekend 1960, Andre Deutsch

References

1902 births
1975 deaths
Royal Army Medical Corps officers
20th-century British medical doctors
British non-fiction writers
British memoirists
People from Market Rasen